Alberto Ferrero may refer to:

 Alberto Ferrero (general) (1885–1969), Italian general
 Alberto Ferrero (footballer) (born 1944), Chilean forward

See also
 Albert Ferrer (born 1970), Spanish footballer